Jack Jia is an American entrepreneur. He is known for founding and leading Musely (formerly Trusper), an online platform to provide skincare medical treatments through technology, as its chief executive officer since its launch in November 2017. He also founded Baynote, a recommender system, in November 2004 and was the founding chief technology officer and senior vice president of Interwoven (Nasdaq: IWOV), where he sponsored a noted BMW Z3 recruiting campaign covered by national and international news organizations. Jia has been a partner and advisor for GSR Ventures, a multi-billion technology venture capital firm, since its inception in 2005. He is an advisory board member for Santa Clara University and the president of HYSTA (Hua Yuan Science and Technology Association), a non-profit organization for promoting entrepreneurship.

Patents 
 U.S. Patent # 6,480,944 (2002) Method of and apparatus for recovery of in-progress changes made in a software application
 U.S. Patent # 6,609,184 (2003) Method of and apparatus for recovery of in-progress changes made in a software application 
 U.S. Patent # 6,505,212 (2003) System and method for website development 
 U.S. Patent # 6,792,454 (2004) System and method for website development 
 Patent Pending (2005). Method and Apparatus for Identifying, Extracting, Capturing, and Leveraging Expertise and Knowledge.

References 
 "Reading Your Customers' Minds", Forbes, October 30, 2009
 "Simulating The Brain: Baynote CEO Jack Jia", Sramana Mitra, October 13, 2009
 "C-Suite Sit Down with Jack Jia", Fox Business TV, September 4, 2008
 "A Conversation with Jack Jia, Founder and CEO of Baynote", Dialogue360, September 30, 2008
 John Brando, "Jack Jia, CEO of Baynote, talks social interaction",  Computer World, August 28, 2008
 John Boudreau, "Baynote Follows That Mouse", San Jose Mercury News, July 28, 2008.
 "AlwaysOn, Jack Jia on Contextual Search", ScribeMedia.Org, January 31, 2008
 Bambi Francisco, "1:1 Interview with Baynote CEO Jack Jia", VatorNews, October 7, 2007
 CNN Transcript on Interwoven's Z3 Giveaway, CNN Morning News, February 23, 2000
 Baynote Leaderhsip, Baynote, January 7, 2009

Living people
American technology chief executives
American chief technology officers
Year of birth missing (living people)